Polyhedral may refer to:

Dihedral (disambiguation), various meanings
Polyhedral compound
Polyhedral combinatorics
Polyhedral cone
Polyhedral cylinder
Polyhedral convex function
Polyhedral dice
Polyhedral dual
Polyhedral formula
Polyhedral graph
Polyhedral group
Polyhedral model
Polyhedral net
Polyhedral number
Polyhedral pyramid
Polyhedral prism
Polyhedral space
Polyhedral skeletal electron pair theory
Polyhedral symbol
Polyhedral symmetry
Polyhedral terrain

See also
 Polyhedron, a geometric shape

Polyhedra